The Selkirk Hurdle is the term used by urban planners, railroad employees, politicians, and others to describe the route that must be taken by freight trains traveling between New York City and other points in downstate New York that are east of the Hudson River, and locations in the United States to the south and west. Advocates claim that this detour and the inefficiencies that result force New York City to rely more heavily on relatively-inefficient trucks than most parts of the United States, where freight trains are more common. However, at least for traffic to and from the west, this route was touted for its efficiency as the "Water Level Route" by the New York Central Railroad because trains using it did not have to climb over the Appalachian Mountains, and it is still used by the New York Central's successor, CSX, for traffic to both sides of the Hudson River.

To cross the Hudson, trains must use the Alfred H. Smith Memorial Bridge or another bridge further north near Mechanicville, New York, operated by Pan Am Southern railroad. Because of the height of the bridge, trains still had to travel west to Maybrook, New York and back, limiting its use when it was in service. The rails on the bridge at Poughkeepsie have been removed and the bridge was converted into the Walkway Over the Hudson State Historic Park in 2009, a  pedestrian footbridge.

The only alternative to the Selkirk Hurdle is for rail cars to be floated across Upper New York Bay: an operation run until 2006 by the New York Cross Harbor Railroad and currently run by New York New Jersey Rail, LLC, now owned by the Port Authority of New York and New Jersey. The Port Authority is investing in improvements to its decayed infrastructure, much of which was washed away by Hurricane Sandy. As trucking has become more prevalent, rail float operations across the bay have dwindled and freight operations on the Bay Ridge Branch have decreased from 600,000 railcar loads per year to less than 3,000 carloads per year. The Port Authority of New York and New Jersey hopes some day to transport as many as 25,000 cars annually.

Eliminating the Selkirk Hurdle is a primary objective of the Cross-Harbor Rail Tunnel, proposed to span Upper New York Bay between Brooklyn and  Jersey City, New Jersey. A draft environmental impact study for the project was released in November 2014.

See also 
 Poughkeepsie Bridge
 Poughkeepsie Bridge Route
 Rail freight transportation in New York City and Long Island
 Selkirk Yard

References

Further reading 
Cross Harbor Freight Movement Project
Move NY & NJ: The Cross Harbor Tunnel Coalition
Tappan Zee Bridge Environmental Review

Rail freight transportation in New York City